Gulyana Guvandiyeva (born 29 May 1988) is an Azerbaijani football referee and a former player who played as a midfielder. She has been a member of the Azerbaijan women's national team.

See also
List of Azerbaijan women's international footballers

References

1988 births
Living people
Women's association football midfielders
Women association football referees
Women's association football referees
Azerbaijani women's footballers
Azerbaijan women's international footballers
Azerbaijani football referees
People from Gegharkunik Province
Armenian Azerbaijanis